The Caudron G.6 was a French reconnaissance aircraft of World War I. It married the wings and engine layout of the unorthodox Caudron G.4 to an all-new fuselage of conventional design. Over 500 of these aircraft were used by the French military for reconnaissance and artillery-spotting duties in 1917 and 1918.

Operators

Aviation Militaire

Specifications

Bibliography

Further reading

 
 

G.6
1910s French military reconnaissance aircraft
Biplanes
Aircraft first flown in 1916
Rotary-engined aircraft
Twin piston-engined tractor aircraft